The 2017 NC State Wolfpack men's soccer team represented North Carolina State University during the 2017 NCAA Division I men's soccer season.  The Wolfpack were led by head coach George Kiefer, in his first season. They played home games at Dail Soccer Field. NC State finished the season with an overall record of 8–6–4 and an ACC record of 3–3–2, earning the team their first appearance in the NCAA Tournament since 2009.

Roster

Updated August 28, 2017

Coaching Staff

Source:

Schedule

Source:

|-
!colspan=8 style=""| Exhibition

|-
!colspan=7 style=""| Regular season

|-
!colspan=7 style=""| ACC Tournament

|-
!colspan=7 style=""| NCAA Tournament

Awards and honors

Rankings

MLS Draft 
The following members of the 2017 NC State Wolfpack men's soccer team were selected in the 2018 MLS SuperDraft.

References

NC State
NC State Wolfpack men's soccer seasons
NC State men's soccer
NC State
NC State